The Greater Britain Exhibition was a colonial exhibition held at Earls Court in 1899 and opened by Prince George, Duke of Cambridge. on 8 May 1899.

Exhibits
Exhibits included a mineral exhibition from Victoria colony, a 120m cyclorama of the Arrival of the Hungarians known as the Feszty Panorama,
a model gold mine,
and a twice-daily equestrian show called Savage South Africa directed by Frank E. Fillis which inspired the 1899 silent film Major Wilson's Last Stand.

One of the gold medals awarded by the exhibition was won by Hans Irvine.

References

1899 in London
World's fairs in London